Belgian Americans are Americans who can trace their ancestry to people from Belgium who immigrated to the United States. While the first natives of the then-Southern Netherlands arrived in America in the 17th century, the majority of Belgian immigrants arrived during the 19th and 20th centuries.  

According to the 2019 U.S. census, there are 339,512 Americans who identify themselves as partially or fully of Belgian ancestry.

History 

During the 17th century, colonists from the Southern Netherlands (the area of modern-day Belgium) lived in several of the Thirteen Colonies of North America. Settlements already existed in New York — in Wallabout (Brooklyn), on Long Island and Staten Island—and New Jersey (Hoboken, Jersey City, Pavonia, Communipaw, and Wallkill). Later, other settlers moved into the Middle States. Many names are derived from the Walloon reformed immigrants who settled there and the Dutch versions of Walloon words used to describe a locale. There were also Southern Netherlands colonies in Connecticut, Delaware, and Pennsylvania established primarily by Walloons, many of whom arrived with the Dutch West India Company (founded by Willem Usselincx, a Fleming).

In the 17th and 18th centuries many Belgians left their mark on American history, including Lord Baltimore (whose family were Flemish aristocrats). Belgian officers also fought during the American Revolutionary War; these included Charles De Pauw (a Fleming who accompanied Lafayette to North America), Thomas Van Gaasbeck, Jacques Rapalje, Anthony Van Etten and Johannes Van Etten.

The first major wave of people from Belgium arrived to the United States during the 19th century, looking for better economic and social conditions for their families (in common with other Western Europeans). Belgian immigrants were first registered in 1820; from then to 1910, 104,000 Belgians entered the U.S. and from 1910 to 1950, the number dropped to 62,000. Between 1847 and 1849 (when Belgium was plagued with disease and economic hardship), 6,000–7,000 Belgians a year arrived in the United States. Antwerp in Belgium was also one of the largest ports for immigration to America and regular Red Star Line ships connected the port with the United States and Canada.

During this era, most Belgians coming to the U.S. were farmers, farm workers or miners; craftsmen (such as masons, cabinetmakers or carpenters) or other persons engaged in commerce (such as lace-makers or glass blowers). During the 20th century, many Belgians arrived in the United States to work in spaces such as universities, laboratories and industry. This is especially true after the world wars ended. Several Dutch-language newspapers were published by Belgian immigrants, including the Gazette van Moline (1907–1940) and the Gazette van Detroit (1914–2018). From 1820 to 1970, about 200,000 Belgians immigrated to the United States. Since 1950, about 1,350 Belgians migrate to the United States each year.

Demographics 

During the 19th century most Belgians settled in places that offered greater access to employment, establishing significant communities in West Virginia; Detroit, Michigan; Door, Brown and Kewaunee Counties, Wisconsin, Pennsylvania, and Indiana. There are also substantial communities of Belgian Americans in Illinois, Minnesota, North Dakota, Ohio, Kentucky, Florida, Washington and Oregon. Many towns and cities across the United States bear the names of their counterparts in Belgium: Liège, Charleroi, Ghent, Antwerp, Namur, Rosiere and Brussels.

Wisconsin and Michigan have the United States's largest Belgian American settlement, located in portions of Brown, Kewaunee and Door counties adjacent to Green Bay. In 1994 a historical marker was dedicated at Namur, Wisconsin, denoting the surrounding area on the National Register of Historic Places. Walloon-speaking Belgians settled in the region during the 1850s, and still constitute a large part of the population.

A number of elements demonstrate the Belgian American presence: place names (Brussels, Namur, Rosiere, Luxemburg, Charleroi), a local French patois, common surnames, unique foods (booyah, trippe, jutt), the Kermesse harvest festival and architecture. Many original wooden structures belonging to Belgian Americans were destroyed in the Peshtigo fire, a firestorm which swept across southern Door County in October 1871; a few stone houses (made of local dolomite) survived. More common are 1880s red-brick houses, distinguished by their modest size and gable-end, bull's-eye windows. Some houses have detached summer kitchens, with baking ovens appended to the rear. The Belgians, many of them devout Catholics, also erected small roadside votive chapels like those in their homeland.

Population 
According to the 2000 U.S. census, there were 360,642 Americans whose ancestors came from Belgium. The states with the largest Belgian communities are:
 Wisconsin: 57,808 (out of 5,363,675 = 1.08%)
 Michigan: 53,135 (out of 9,938,444 = 0.53%)
 Illinois: 34,208 (out of 12,419,293 = 0.28%)
 California: 26,820
 Minnesota: 15,627 (out of 4,919,479 = 0.32%)
 Florida: 14,751
 New York: 12,034
 Indiana: 11,918
 Texas: 10,595
 Ohio: 9,651

Also some medium communities are in Washington, Tennessee, Kentucky, Missouri and Iowa.

Religions 

The majority of Belgian Americans are Roman Catholic, although some are Presbyterians and Episcopalians. By 1900, Belgian religious orders were present in 16 states. The Sisters of Notre Dame, from Namur, established bilingual schools in 14 of those states and the Benedictines built missions in the western part of the country. The Jesuits founded St. Louis University in 1818, expanding the university's influence with Belgian teachers and benefactors. Belgian immigrants do not usually have churches of their own, attending Catholic churches founded by other ethnic Catholics. However, two more-homogeneous groups (in Door County, Wisconsin and Detroit) established churches of their own.

Since then, Belgians have established several churches in the United States. In 1853 a Belgian missionary, Father Edward Daems, joined with a group of immigrants to establish a community in Bay Settlement, Wisconsin known as Aux premiers Belges (Naar de eerste Belgen) ("to the first Belgians"). By 1860, St. Hubert's Church was built in Bay Settlement and St. Mary's in Namur. Also built in the 19th century were St. Michael's, St. John the Baptist and St. Joseph's in Door County, the French Presbyterian Church in Green Bay and small, roadside chapels for people who lived too far away to attend parish churches regularly.

In 1834 Father Bonduel of Commnes, Belgium was the first priest to be ordained in Detroit. The first Catholic college (1836) was operated by Flemish Belgian priests, and the first school for girls was founded (in 1834) by an order of Belgian nuns. By 1857 Catholics in Detroit were a sizable group, and in 1884 the first Belgian parish was established. However, many Belgian Catholic parishes have disappeared or merged with other parishes due to the shortage of priests.

Military service

Belgian Americans fought in the American Revolutionary War, both world wars and the Korean and Vietnam wars. During World War I Belgian Americans gave generously to the aid of children who were victims of the war, resulting in an official delegation from Belgium to the United States honoring their efforts in 1917.

Notable people

See also 

Jessé de Forest
Belgian Canadians
Belgium–United States relations

References

Further reading
 Bayer, Henry G. The Belgians: First Settlers in New York and in the Middle States with a Review of the Events which led to their Immigration. New York: Devin-Adair Co., 1925.

External links

 Belgian-American Research Collection 
 Belgians at Encyclopedia of Chicago
 at Cofrin Library, University of Wisconsin-Green Bay

 
 
European-American society
United States